Nanbuzaka Dam  is a rockfill dam located in Hokkaido Prefecture in Japan. The dam is used for flood control. The catchment area of the dam is 12.7 km2. The dam impounds about 13  ha of land when full and can store 965 thousand cubic meters of water. The construction of the dam was started on 1986 and completed in 2009.

References

Dams in Hokkaido